Berg is a municipality in the district of Germersheim, in Rhineland-Palatinate, Germany. It is situated on the border with France. The Ortsteil Neulauterburg, 2 km west of the centre of Berg, is contiguous with the French town Lauterbourg, across the small river Lauter. Berg has a railway station on the regional line from Wörth am Rhein to Lauterbourg.

References

Municipalities in Rhineland-Palatinate
Germersheim (district)